An atmospheric window is a range of wavelengths of the electromagnetic spectrum that can pass through the atmosphere of Earth. The optical, infrared and radio windows comprise the three main atmospheric windows. The windows provide direct channels for Earth's surface to receive electromagnetic energy from the Sun, and for thermal radiation from the surface to leave to space. Atmospheric windows are useful for astronomy, remote sensing, telecommunications and other science & technology applications.

Role in Earth's energy budget 
Atmospheric windows, especially the optical and infrared, affect the distribution of energy flows and temperatures within Earth's energy balance. The windows are themselves dependent upon clouds, water vapor, trace greenhouse gases, and other components of the atmosphere.

Out of an average 340 watts per square meter (W/m2) of solar irradiance at the top of the atmosphere, about 200 W/m2 reaches the surface via windows, mostly the optical and infrared. Also, out of about 340 W/m2 of reflected shortwave (105 W/m2) plus outgoing longwave radiation (235 W/m2), 80-100 W/m2 exits to space through the infrared window depending on cloudiness. About 40 W/m2 of this transmitted amount is emitted by the surface, while most of the remainder comes from lower regions of the atmosphere. In a complimentary manner, the infrared window also transmits to the surface a portion of down-welling thermal radiation that is emitted within colder upper regions of the atmosphere.

Some sources, mainly the ones related to the study of the greenhouse effect, suggest a synonymity of the terms atmospheric window and infrared window, because the infrared window is examined as an escape route for a fraction of the thermal radiation emitted near the surface. Sources within other fields of science and technology have exhibited less ambiguity, namely radio astronomy and remote sensing. 

The "window" concept is useful to provide qualitative insight into some important features of atmospheric radiation transport. Full characterization of the absorption, emission, and scattering coefficients of the atmospheric medium is needed in order to perform a rigorous quantitative analysis (typically done with atmospheric radiative transfer codes).  Application of the Beer-Lambert Law may yield sufficient quantitative estimates for wavelengths where the atmosphere is optically thin. Window properties are mostly encoded within the absorption profile.

Other applications

In astronomy 
Up until the 1940s, astronomers used optical telescopes to observe distant astronomical objects whose radiation reached the earth through the optical window. After that time, the development of radio telescopes gave rise to the more successful field of radio astronomy that is based on the analysis of observations made through the radio window.

In telecommunications  
Communications satellites greatly depend on the atmospheric windows for the transmission and reception of signals: the satellite-ground links are established at frequencies that fall within the spectral bandwidth of atmospheric windows. Shortwave radio does the opposite, using frequencies that produce skywaves rather than those that escape through the radio windows.

In remote sensing 
Both active (signal emitted by satellite or aircraft, reflection detected by sensor) and passive (reflection of sunlight detected by the sensor) remote sensing techniques work with wavelength ranges contained in the atmospheric windows.

See also 

 Optical window                                                                                                                                  
 Infrared window                                                                                                                                  
 Radio window                                                                                                                                  
 Water window, for soft x-rays

References 

Electromagnetic spectrum
Atmosphere of Earth